Rich Johnson may refer to:

 Rich Johnson (publishing executive), publishing executive in the field of graphic novels
 Rich Johnson (basketball) (1946–1994), American basketball player
 Rich Johnson (American football) (born 1947), American football running back
 Rich Johnson (meteorologist), former The Weather Channel meteorologist

See also
Dick Johnson (disambiguation)
Richard Johnson (disambiguation)
Rick Johnson (disambiguation)